This page provides links to other pages comprising the list of airports in South America.

Due to the number of airports, each country or territory has a separate list:

See also
 Wikipedia:WikiProject Aviation/Airline destination lists: South America

Lists of airports
 
Airports